The 2008–09 Memphis Grizzlies season was their 14th season of the franchise in the National Basketball Association (NBA). The Memphis Grizzlies finished 2 games ahead of their 2007–08 output, and finished 12th in the Western Conference as opposed to 14th.

Key dates
June 26: The 2008 NBA draft took place in New York City.
July 1: The free agency period started.

Draft picks

Roster

Regular season

Standings

Game log

|- bgcolor="#ffcccc"
| 1
| October 29
| @ Houston
| 
| Rudy Gay (20)
| Darrell Arthur (15)
| Mike Conley, Jr., Kyle Lowry (3)
| Toyota Center18,196
| 0–1
|- bgcolor="#bbffbb"
| 2
| October 31
| Orlando
| 
| Rudy Gay (29)
| Darrell Arthur (10)
| Kyle Lowry (4)
| FedExForum16,139
| 1–1

|- bgcolor="#ffcccc"
| 3
| November 1
| @ Chicago
| 
| Rudy Gay (20)
| Darko Miličić (9)
| Kyle Lowry (4)
| United Center21,785
| 1–2
|- bgcolor="#bbffbb"
| 4
| November 3
| Golden State
| 
| Marc Gasol (27)
| Marc Gasol (16)
| Mike Conley, Jr. (7)
| FedExForum10,121
| 2–2
|- bgcolor="#ffcccc"
| 5
| November 5
| @ Sacramento
| 
| O. J. Mayo (28)
| Rudy Gay, Kyle Lowry, Marc Gasol (6)
| Kyle Lowry (7)
| ARCO Arena13,685
| 2–3
|- bgcolor="#bbffbb"
| 6
| November 7
| @ Golden State
| 
| Rudy Gay (23)
| Darrell Arthur (12)
| Mike Conley, Jr. (6)
| Oracle Arena18,744
| 3–3
|- bgcolor="#ffcccc"
| 7
| November 9
| @ Denver
| 
| O. J. Mayo (31)
| Marc Gasol, O. J. Mayo (8)
| Mike Conley, Jr., Rudy Gay (4)
| Pepsi Center14,359
| 3–4
|- bgcolor="#ffcccc"
| 8
| November 10
| @ Phoenix
| 
| O. J. Mayo (33)
| Rudy Gay, Darrell Arthur (7)
| O. J. Mayo (5)
| US Airways Center18,422
| 3–5
|- bgcolor="#ffcccc"
| 9
| November 12
| New York
| 
| Rudy Gay (20)
| Hakim Warrick (8)
| Marko Jarić, Kyle Lowry (4)
| FedExForum10,129
| 3–6
|- bgcolor="#ffcccc"
| 10
| November 14
| Milwaukee
| 
| O. J. Mayo (25)
| Hakim Warrick (10)
| Mike Conley, Jr., Kyle Lowry (4)
| FedExForum11,308
| 3–7
|- bgcolor="#bbffbb"
| 11
| November 18
| Sacramento
| 
| Rudy Gay (22)
| Hakim Warrick (10)
| Mike Conley, Jr. (7)
| FedExForum10,834
| 4–7
|- bgcolor="#ffcccc"
| 12
| November 21
| @ Dallas
| 
| O. J. Mayo (19)
| Rudy Gay, Marc Gasol (8)
| Rudy Gay (5)
| American Airlines Center20,035
| 4–8
|- bgcolor="#ffcccc"
| 13
| November 22
| Utah
| 
| O. J. Mayo (23)
| Darrell Arthur (9)
| Mike Conley, Jr. (8)
| FedExForum13,121
| 4–9
|- bgcolor="#ffcccc"
| 14
| November 24
| San Antonio
| 
| O. J. Mayo (26)
| Darko Miličić (11)
| O. J. Mayo, Kyle Lowry (3)
| FedExForum12,053
| 4–10
|- bgcolor="#ffcccc"
| 15
| November 26
| @ Utah
| 
| Rudy Gay (27)
| Marc Gasol (8)
| Kyle Lowry (5)
| EnergySolutions Arena19,911
| 4–11
|- bgcolor="#ffcccc"
| 16
| November 28
| @ San Antonio
| 
| O. J. Mayo (32)
| Rudy Gay, Marc Gasol, Darko Miličić (6)
| O. J. Mayo, Mike Conley, Jr. (4)
| AT&T Center17,074
| 4–12
|- bgcolor="#ffcccc"
| 17
| November 29
| Oklahoma City
| 
| O. J. Mayo (30)
| O. J. Mayo (7)
| Mike Conley, Jr. (6)
| FedExForum11,977
| 4–13

|- bgcolor="#ffcccc"
| 18
| December 3
| @ Atlanta
| 
| Hakim Warrick (20)
| Rudy Gay (10)
| Mike Conley, Jr., Kyle Lowry (4)
| Philips Arena12,088
| 4–14
|- bgcolor="#bbffbb"
| 19
| December 5
| L.A. Clippers
| 
| Rudy Gay (25)
| Darko Miličić (9)
| Kyle Lowry (5)
| FedExForum10,484
| 5–14
|- bgcolor="#ffcccc"
| 20
| December 6
| @ New Orleans
| 
| Marc Gasol (21)
| Marc Gasol (7)
| O. J. Mayo (5)
| New Orleans Arena16,822
| 5–15
|- bgcolor="#bbffbb"
| 21
| December 8
| Houston
| 
| Rudy Gay (20)
| Hakim Warrick, Marc Gasol (8)
| Kyle Lowry (5)
| FedExForum10,691
| 6–15
|- bgcolor="#bbffbb"
| 22
| December 10
| @ Oklahoma City
| 
| Rudy Gay (22)
| Rudy Gay, Hakim Warrick, Marc Gasol (6)
| O. J. Mayo, Kyle Lowry (5)
| Ford Center18,009
| 7–15
|- bgcolor="#bbffbb"
| 23
| December 12
| Chicago
| 
| Rudy Gay (29)
| Darko Miličić (11)
| Mike Conley, Jr. (7)
| FedExForum17,132
| 8–15
|- bgcolor="#bbffbb"
| 24
| December 14
| Miami
| 
| O. J. Mayo (28)
| Marc Gasol (7)
| Kyle Lowry (5)
| FedExForum12,271
| 9–15
|- bgcolor="#ffcccc"
| 25
| December 16
| New Orleans
| 
| Rudy Gay (28)
| Marc Gasol (11)
| O. J. Mayo, Mike Conley, Jr. (4)
| FedExForum10,231
| 9–16
|- bgcolor="#ffcccc"
| 26
| December 19
| Charlotte
| 
| Rudy Gay (17)
| Marc Gasol (6)
| O. J. Mayo (4)
| FedExForum11,869
| 9–17
|- bgcolor="#ffcccc"
| 27
| December 22
| L.A. Lakers
| 
| Rudy Gay (23)
| Darko Miličić (8)
| Kyle Lowry (7)
| FedExForum17,456
| 9–18
|- bgcolor="#ffcccc"
| 28
| December 23
| @ Dallas
| 
| Hakim Warrick (17)
| Rudy Gay (9)
| Kyle Lowry (4)
| American Airlines Center20,200
| 9–19
|- bgcolor="#bbffbb"
| 29
| December 26
| Indiana
| 
| Hakim Warrick (21)
| O. J. Mayo (8)
| O. J. Mayo (7)
| FedExForum12,346
| 10–19
|- bgcolor="#ffcccc"
| 30
| December 27
| @ San Antonio
| 
| O. J. Mayo (29)
| Rudy Gay (11)
| Kyle Lowry (8)
| AT&T Center18,797
| 10–20
|- bgcolor="#ffcccc"
| 31
| December 29
| @ Minnesota
| 
| O. J. Mayo (23)
| Hakim Warrick (8)
| Kyle Lowry (12)
| Target Center12,207
| 10–21
|- bgcolor="#ffcccc"
| 32
| December 30
| Phoenix
| 
| Hakim Warrick (25)
| Marc Gasol (13)
| Kyle Lowry (6)
| FedExForum14,471
| 10–22

|- bgcolor="#ffcccc"
| 33
| January 2
| San Antonio
| 
| Hakim Warrick (16)
| Marc Gasol (11)
| Kyle Lowry, Rudy Gay (3)
| FedExForum12,597
| 10–23
|- bgcolor="#bbffbb"
| 34
| January 4
| Dallas
| 
| O. J. Mayo (21)
| Hakim Warrick, Rudy Gay (7)
| Kyle Lowry (5)
| FedExForum11,731
| 11–23
|- bgcolor="#ffcccc"
| 35
| January 6
| Minnesota
| 
| Hakim Warrick (22)
| O. J. Mayo (8)
| O. J. Mayo, Kyle Lowry (5)
| FedExForum10,156
| 11–24
|- bgcolor="#ffcccc"
| 36
| January 7
| @ New Jersey
| 
| O. J. Mayo (26)
| Marc Gasol (10)
| O. J. Mayo, Rudy Gay, Kyle Lowry, Greg Buckner (3)
| Izod Center11,552
| 11–25
|- bgcolor="#ffcccc"
| 37
| January 9
| @ Toronto
| 
| Rudy Gay (22)
| Darrell Arthur (7)
| Marc Gasol, Mike Conley, Jr. (4)
| Air Canada Centre18,486
| 11–26
|- bgcolor="#ffcccc"
| 38
| January 13
| Cleveland
| 
| Kyle Lowry (25)
| Marc Gasol (11)
| Kyle Lowry (7)
| FedExForum15,121
| 11–27
|- bgcolor="#ffcccc"
| 39
| January 16
| Utah
| 
| O. J. Mayo (23)
| Marc Gasol (10)
| Marc Gasol (3)
| FedExForum10,422
| 11–28
|- bgcolor="#ffcccc"
| 40
| January 19
| Detroit
| 
| Rudy Gay, O. J. Mayo (15)
| Marc Gasol (13)
| Mike Conley, Jr. (5)
| FedExForum17,483
| 11–29
|- bgcolor="#ffcccc"
| 41
| January 21
| @ Charlotte
| 
| Rudy Gay (26)
| Marc Gasol (6)
| Mike Conley, Jr. (5)
| Time Warner Cable Arena11,249
| 11–30
|- bgcolor="#ffcccc"
| 42
| January 23
| @ New York
| 
| Rudy Gay (20)
| Rudy Gay (9)
| Mike Conley, Jr. (4)
| Madison Square Garden18,391
| 11–31
|- bgcolor="#ffcccc"
| 43
| January 24
| New Jersey
| 
| O. J. Mayo (23)
| Marc Gasol (10)
| Rudy Gay (4)
| FedExForum12,817
| 11–32
|- bgcolor="#ffcccc"
| 44
| January 27
| Denver
| 
| O. J. Mayo (19)
| Hakim Warrick (10)
| Kyle Lowry, Mike Conley, Jr. (4)
| FedExForum11,338
| 11–33
|- bgcolor="#ffcccc"
| 45
| January 28
| @ Oklahoma City
| 
| Rudy Gay (25)
| Rudy Gay, Darrell Arthur (8)
| Mike Conley, Jr. (9)
| Ford Center18,450
| 11–34
|- bgcolor="#ffcccc"
| 46
| January 31
| L.A. Lakers
| 
| Rudy Gay (23)
| Hakim Warrick, Darrell Arthur (7)
| Mike Conley, Jr. (7)
| FedExForum18,119
| 11–35

|- bgcolor="#bbffbb"
| 47
| February 2
| @ Washington
| 
| O. J. Mayo (33)
| Marc Gasol (11)
| Mike Conley, Jr. (5)
| Verizon Center11,442
| 12–35
|- bgcolor="#bbffbb"
| 48
| February 4
| Houston
| 
| O. J. Mayo (32)
| Rudy Gay, Mike Conley, Jr. (9)
| Mike Conley, Jr. (7)
| FedExForum10,109
| 13–35
|- bgcolor="#ffcccc"
| 49
| February 6
| L.A. Clippers
| 
| Rudy Gay (26)
| Rudy Gay, O. J. Mayo, Marc Gasol (5)
| Mike Conley, Jr. (3)
| FedExForum10,912
| 13–36
|- bgcolor="#bbffbb"
| 50
| February 7
| Toronto
| 
| O. J. Mayo, Hakim Warrick (16)
| O. J. Mayo, Marc Gasol, Greg Buckner, Hakim Warrick, Darko Miličić (8)
| Mike Conley, Jr. (8)
| FedExForum11,498
| 14–36
|- bgcolor="#bbffbb"
| 51
| February 9
| New Orleans
| 
| O. J. Mayo (22)
| O. J. Mayo (16)
| Mike Conley, Jr. (8)
| FedExForum10,896
| 15–36
|- bgcolor="#ffcccc"
| 52
| February 11
| @ Philadelphia
| 
| Hakim Warrick (31)
| Marc Gasol (9)
| O. J. Mayo (5)
| Wachovia Center12,812
| 15–37
|- bgcolor="#ffcccc"
| 53
| February 17
| @ Utah
| 
| O. J. Mayo, Rudy Gay (18)
| Darko Miličić (10)
| Mike Conley, Jr. (4)
| EnergySolutions Arena19,911
| 15–38
|- bgcolor="#ffcccc"
| 54
| February 18
| @ Portland
| 
| Rudy Gay (20)
| Marc Gasol (10)
| Mike Conley, Jr. (10)
| Rose Garden20,385
| 15–39
|- bgcolor="#ffcccc"
| 55
| February 20
| Sacramento
| 
| O. J. Mayo (24)
| Rudy Gay, Mike Conley, Jr. (10)
| Mike Conley, Jr. (7)
| FedExForum15,036
| 15–40
|- bgcolor="#ffcccc"
| 56
| February 24
| @ Cleveland
| 
| Hakim Warrick, Rudy Gay (13)
| Marc Gasol (9)
| Mike Conley, Jr. (7)
| Quicken Loans Arena20,562
| 15–41
|- bgcolor="#ffcccc"
| 57
| February 25
| @ Indiana
| 
| Marc Gasol (22)
| Marc Gasol (15)
| Mike Conley, Jr. (8)
| Conseco Fieldhouse13,211
| 15–42
|- bgcolor="#ffcccc"
| 58
| February 28
| Oklahoma City
| 
| Rudy Gay (20)
| Marc Gasol (9)
| Mike Conley, Jr. (4)
| FedExForum10,074
| 15–43

|- bgcolor="#ffcccc"
| 59
| March 3
| @ L.A. Lakers
| 
| Marc Gasol, O. J. Mayo (17)
| Marc Gasol (14)
| Rudy Gay, Mike Conley, Jr. (6)
| Staples Center18,997
| 15–44
|- bgcolor="#bbffbb"
| 60
| March 4
| @ L.A. Clippers
| 
| Rudy Gay (35)
| Rudy Gay, Marc Gasol (8)
| Marc Gasol (10)
| Staples Center13,813
| 16–44
|- bgcolor="#ffcccc"
| 61
| March 7
| Philadelphia
| 
| Mike Conley, Jr. (31)
| Marc Gasol (13)
| Mike Conley, Jr. (9)
| FedExForum14,458
| 16–45
|- bgcolor="#ffcccc"
| 62
| March 8
| @ Houston
| 
| Rudy Gay (21)
| Darrell Arthur (12)
| Mike Conley, Jr. (7)
| Toyota Center16,179
| 16–46
|- bgcolor="#ffcccc"
| 63
| March 11
| @ Minnesota
| 
| O. J. Mayo (18)
| Darko Miličić (10)
| O. J. Mayo, Mike Conley, Jr. (5)
| Target Center12,443
| 16–47
|- bgcolor="#ffcccc"
| 64
| March 13
| @ Boston
| 
| Rudy Gay (26)
| Marc Gasol (15)
| Mike Conley, Jr. (9)
| TD Banknorth Garden18,624
| 16–48
|- bgcolor="#bbffbb"
| 65
| March 15
| @ Detroit
| 
| Mike Conley, Jr. (20)
| Darko Miličić (11)
| Marc Gasol (4)
| The Palace of Auburn Hills22,076
| 17–48
|- bgcolor="#ffcccc"
| 66
| March 16
| Portland
| 
| O. J. Mayo (21)
| Rudy Gay (11)
| O. J. Mayo (6)
| FedExForum11,417
| 17–49
|- bgcolor="#ffcccc"
| 67
| March 18
| Denver
| 
| Rudy Gay (30)
| Marc Gasol (8)
| Mike Conley, Jr. (10)
| FedExForum11,087
| 17–50
|- bgcolor="#ffcccc"
| 68
| March 20
| @ New Orleans
| 
| Rudy Gay (23)
| Marc Gasol, Darko Miličić (6)
| O. J. Mayo (4)
| New Orleans Arena17,837
| 17–51
|- bgcolor="#ffcccc"
| 69
| March 21
| Boston
| 
| Hakim Warrick (20)
| Greg Buckner (7)
| Rudy Gay, Mike Conley, Jr. (3)
| FedExForum18,119
| 17–52
|- bgcolor="#ffcccc"
| 70
| March 23
| @ Miami
| 
| O. J. Mayo (21)
| Marc Gasol (9)
| Mike Conley, Jr. (5)
| American Airlines Arena18,654
| 17–53
|- bgcolor="#bbffbb"
| 71
| March 27
| @ Sacramento
| 
| Marc Gasol (27)
| Rudy Gay (9)
| Mike Conley, Jr. (5)
| ARCO Arena12,987
| 18–53
|- bgcolor="#ffcccc"
| 72
| March 28
| @ Portland
| 
| O. J. Mayo (12)
| Hamed Haddadi, Mike Conley, Jr. (6)
| O. J. Mayo (5)
| Rose Garden20,680
| 18–54
|- bgcolor="#bbffbb"
| 73
| March 30
| @ Golden State
| 
| O. J. Mayo (24)
| Hamed Haddadi (8)
| O. J. Mayo (10)
| Oracle Arena18,471
| 19–54

|- bgcolor="#bbffbb"
| 74
| April 1
| Washington
| 
| Rudy Gay (25)
| Marc Gasol (9)
| O. J. Mayo (7)
| FedExForum10,013
| 20–54
|- bgcolor="#bbffbb"
| 75
| April 3
| Dallas
| 
| Rudy Gay (27)
| Rudy Gay (10)
| Mike Conley, Jr. (5)
| FedExForum15,126
| 21–54
|- bgcolor="#bbffbb"
| 76
| April 4
| @ Milwaukee
| 
| Rudy Gay (26)
| Marc Gasol (10)
| Mike Conley, Jr. (9)
| Bradley Center18,717
| 22–54
|- bgcolor="#ffcccc"
| 77
| April 7
| Portland
| 
| O. J. Mayo (31)
| Darrell Arthur (5)
| Mike Conley, Jr. (8)
| FedExForum10,089
| 22–55
|- bgcolor="#ffcccc"
| 78
| April 8
| @ Orlando
| 
| Rudy Gay (18)
| Marc Gasol (8)
| O. J. Mayo, Darrell Arthur (2)
| Amway Arena17,461
| 22–56
|- bgcolor="#bbffbb"
| 79
| April 10
| Phoenix
| 
| O. J. Mayo, Rudy Gay (20)
| Darrell Arthur, Hakim Warrick (10)
| O. J. Mayo, Mike Conley, Jr. (6)
| FedExForum15,908
| 23–56
|- bgcolor="#ffcccc"
| 80
| April 12
| @ L.A. Lakers
| 
| O. J. Mayo (20)
| Marc Gasol (8)
| Marc Gasol, Mike Conley, Jr. (4)
| Staples Center18,997
| 23–57
|- bgcolor="#ffcccc"
| 81
| April 13
| @ Phoenix
| 
| Hakim Warrick, Rudy Gay (26)
| Hakim Warrick (9)
| Mike Conley, Jr. (6)
| US Airways Center18,422
| 23–58
|- bgcolor="#ccffcc"
| 82
| April 15
| Atlanta
| 
| O. J. Mayo (26)
| Darrell Arthur (10)
| Mike Conley, Jr. (7)
| FedExForum12,736
| 24–58
|-

Awards and records
O. J. Mayo, NBA All-Rookie Team 1st Team
Marc Gasol, NBA All-Rookie Team 2nd Team

Transactions

Free agents

Additions

Subtractions

References

Memphis Grizzlies seasons
Memphis
Memphis Grizzlies
Memphis Grizzlies
Events in Memphis, Tennessee